Joachim was the husband of Saint Anne and the father of Mary, the mother of Jesus.

Joachim may also refer to:

People and fictional characters
 Joachim (given name), a list of people and fictional characters
 Joachim (surname), a list of people

Other uses
 Joachim (2011 storm), a European windstorm in 2011
 Joachim Creek, a river in Missouri, United States
 Joachim (Star Trek), an episode of the television series Star Trek

See also
 Saint Joachim (disambiguation)